Menegazzia aeneofusca is a species of lichen from South America, New Zealand, and Australia.

See also
List of Menegazzia species

References

aeneofusca
Lichen species
Lichens described in 1883
Lichens of Australia
Lichens of New Zealand
Lichens of South America
Taxa named by Johannes Müller Argoviensis